The Petit Jean River is a  river in west-central Arkansas. The river rises in the Ouachita Mountains in northern Scott County; it flows through Logan County and Yell County, defining the border between Yell County and Conway County before reaching its mouth at the Arkansas River north of Petit Jean State Park. The city of Danville, named after a steamboat that navigated the river in 1840, is the largest settlement on the river. Blue Mountain Lake, which straddles the border between Logan and Yell Counties, was created when the river was dammed in 1947. The river is the longest located entirely within the Arkansas River Valley.

According to local legend, the river and the nearby Petit Jean Mountain were both named after a French woman who posed as a man to follow a lover to America. Due to her size, she was nicknamed "Petit Jean" by her ship's crew. She fell ill and died after reaching Arkansas and was reportedly buried on the side of the mountain. An alternate explanation states that the river was named for the French phrase "petit jaune", or "little yellow", due to its appearance.

The discharge of the Petit Jean has been measured by the USGS since 1916.

Two bridges across the river, one in Yell County and one in Logan County, are listed on the National Register of Historic Places.

References

Rivers of Arkansas
Tributaries of the Arkansas River
Rivers of Conway County, Arkansas
Rivers of Logan County, Arkansas
Bodies of water of Scott County, Arkansas
Rivers of Yell County, Arkansas